Krishna Swamy Bala Murali (born 31 May 1969) is a former Indian cricket umpire. He stood in three ODI games between 1994 and 1997.

See also
 List of One Day International cricket umpires

References

1969 births
Living people
Indian One Day International cricket umpires
Cricketers from Kochi